Geneva-on-the-Lake is a village in northwestern Ashtabula County, Ohio, United States, along the southern shore of Lake Erie. A small resort town, the population was 916 at the 2020 census.

History

Settlement of the original area known as the Connecticut Western Reserve started in the early 1800s, as investors, farmers, and frontiersmen from New England and the Mid-Atlantic began to farm in the area and capitalize on the natural resources of Lake Erie and its shoreline.  Industry along the lake shore continued to develop, including a lime burning business along Cowles Creek on the west, along with small-scale lumber processing and ship building at Indian Creek on the east.  In 1869, Cullen Spencer and Edward Pratt purchased property known as Sturgeon Point (now Mapleton Beach) and opened it as a public picnic grounds with beach access. Later, a pony-powered carousel of sorts would be added which later help establish the town as Ohio's first summer resort.  

In order to accommodate more visitors, residents built and established boarding houses and inns; the first being what is now the Jennie Munger Gregory Museum. Vacation residences continued to grow and expand through the early 1900s to include places such as the Idle-A-While and Shady Beach Inn. Erieview Park was started in 1945 by E.M. "Pop" Pera, and it grew to include nine adult and nine children's amusement park rides including The Fright Zone, one of three scary dark rides created by the Allen Herschel Co.  The park closed in 2006, but the Ferris wheel and carousel are still in operation nearby.  Starting in 1964 with the purchase of Chestnut Grove, portions of land which were to become the Geneva-on-the-Lake State Park continued to grow through 1974 to include cabins, campgrounds, and a swimming beach.

Geography
Geneva-on-the-Lake is located at  (41.857753, -80.946372).

Demographics

2010 census
As of the census of 2010, there were 1,288 people, 589 households, and 326 families residing in the village. The racial makeup of the village was 95.9% White, 0.2% African American, 0.2% Native American, 0.2% Asian, 0.2% Pacific Islander, 0.8% from other races, and 2.4% from two or more races. Hispanic or Latino of any race were 3.2% of the population.

There were 589 households, of which 24.8% had children under the age of 18 living with them, 33.8% were married couples living together, 15.1% had a female householder with no husband present, 6.5% had a male householder with no wife present, and 44.7% were non-families. 34.5% of all households were made up of individuals, and 11.6% had someone living alone who was 65 years of age or older. The average household size was 2.19 and the average family size was 2.80.

The median age in the village was 42.7 years. 19.3% of residents were under the age of 18; 7.7% were between the ages of 18 and 24; 26.4% were from 25 to 44; 32.7% were from 45 to 64; and 13.8% were 65 years of age or older. The gender makeup of the village was 50.7% male and 49.3% female.

2000 census
As of the census of 2000, there were 1,545 people, 665 households, and 395 families residing in the village. The population density was 760.9 people per square mile (293.9/km2). There were 1,167 housing units at an average density of 574.7 per square mile (222.0/km2). The racial makeup of the village was 96.18% White, 0.58% African American, 0.32% Native American, 0.32% Asian, 1.04% from other races, and 1.55% from two or more races. Hispanic or Latino of any race were 2.20% of the population. 24.5% were of German, 12.9% Irish, 10.4% English, 9.2% American and 7.8% Italian ancestry according to Census 2000.

There were 665 households, out of which 30.2% had children under the age of 18 living with them, 38.5% were married couples living together, 15.8% had a female householder with no husband present, and 40.5% were non-families. 31.9% of all households were made up of individuals, and 9.0% had someone living alone who was 65 years of age or older. The average household size was 2.32 and the average family size was 2.90.

In the village, the population was spread out, with 26.6% under the age of 18, 8.9% from 18 to 24, 31.0% from 25 to 44, 20.7% from 45 to 64, and 12.8% who were 65 years of age or older. The median age was 36 years. For every 100 females there were 99.6 males. For every 100 females age 18 and over, there were 96.9 males.

The median income for a household in the village was $29,583, and the median income for a family was $31,786. Males had a median income of $28,375 versus $20,655 for females. The per capita income for the village was $15,860. About 15.0% of families and 19.1% of the population were below the poverty line, including 28.8% of those under age 18 and 6.3% of those age 65 or over.

Culture

Geneva-on-the-Lake's central attraction is "the Strip", a section of State Route 531 which is lined with parks, restaurants, and arcades, and has been a tourist attraction for decades.  Eddie's Grill, an icon of "the Strip" has been catering to visitors since 1950 when it started as a Richardson Root Beer and hotdog stand.  Through the years, it has grown into a patio, Dairy Queen, pizza parlor, and arcade serving patrons in a classic 1950s-style environment. In 2004, the Lodge and Conference Center at Geneva State Park, a $17 million investment opened on the lakefront allowing visitors an upscale, year-round place to stay, imbibe in wine-tasting, and view Lake Erie from an outdoor or indoor pool.  Capo's Pizza marked its 50th anniversary on the Strip in 2015, where they serve a family recipe of pizza by the slice on the corner of New Street and the Strip.

One of a number of seasonal events is the "Thunder on The Strip," an annual Biker Rally held the weekend after Labor Day. Started in 2007, "Thunder on The Strip" attracts thousands of motorcyclists from around the country and brings a boost to local business.

Education
The Geneva Area City School District provides K–12 education to students in Geneva-on-the-Lake. The district has three elementary schools (Geneva Platt R. Spencer Elementary, Cork Elementary and Austinburg Elementary), one middle school (Geneva Middle School) and one high school (Geneva High School). The elementary schools serve students in grades K–5, while the middle school and high schools serve students in grades 6–8 and 9–12 respectively. The district has an open enrollment policy, allowing students from the entire county, as well as Lake and Geauga Counties to enroll.

Notable people
Ransom E. Olds, founder of the Oldsmobile car company

References

External links

 Geneva-on-the-Lake official tourism website

Villages in Ashtabula County, Ohio
Villages in Ohio
Ohio populated places on Lake Erie